LinkedIn is a business and employment-focused social media platform that works through websites and mobile apps. It launched on May 5, 2003. It is now owned by Microsoft. The platform is primarily used for professional networking and career development, and allows job seekers to post their CVs and employers to post jobs. From 2015 most of the company's revenue came from selling access to information about its members to recruiters and sales professionals. Since December 2016, it has been a wholly owned subsidiary of Microsoft.  LinkedIn has 900+ million registered members from over 200 countries and territories.

LinkedIn allows members (both workers and employers) to create profiles and connect with each other in an online social network which may represent real-world professional relationships. Members can invite anyone (whether an existing member or not) to become a connection. LinkedIn can also be used to organize offline events, join groups, write articles, publish job postings, post photos and videos, and more.

Company overview 
Founded in Mountain View, California, LinkedIn is currently headquartered in Sunnyvale, California, with 33 global offices. In May 2020, the company had around 20,500 employees.

LinkedIn's CEO is Ryan Roslansky. Jeff Weiner, previously CEO of LinkedIn, is now the Executive Chairman. Reid Hoffman, founder of LinkedIn, is chairman of the board. It was funded by Sequoia Capital, Greylock, Bain Capital Ventures, Bessemer Venture Partners and the European Founders Fund. LinkedIn reached profitability in March 2006. Since January 2011 the company had received a total of $103 million of investment.

According to a 2016 The New York Times article, US high school students were creating LinkedIn profiles to include with their college applications. Based in the United States, the site is, as of 2013, available in 24 languages. LinkedIn filed for an initial public offering in January 2011 and traded its first shares in May, under the NYSE symbol "LNKD".

History

Founding from 2002 to 2011 

The company was founded in December 2002 by Reid Hoffman and the founding team members from PayPal and Socialnet.com (Allen Blue, Eric Ly, Jean-Luc Vaillant, Lee Hower, Konstantin Guericke, Stephen Beitzel, David Eves, Ian McNish, Yan Pujante, Chris Saccheri). In late 2003, Sequoia Capital led the Series A investment in the company. In August 2004, LinkedIn reached 1 million users. In March 2006, LinkedIn achieved its first month of profitability. In April 2007, LinkedIn reached 10 million users. In February 2008, LinkedIn launched a mobile version of the site.

In June 2008, Sequoia Capital, Greylock Partners, and other venture capital firms purchased a 5% stake in the company for $53 million, giving the company a post-money valuation of approximately $1 billion. In November 2009, LinkedIn opened its office in Mumbai and soon thereafter in Sydney, as it started its Asia-Pacific team expansion. In 2010 LinkedIn opened an International Headquarters in Dublin, Ireland, received a $20 million investment from Tiger Global Management LLC at a valuation of approximately $2 billion, announced its first acquisition, Mspoke, and improved its 1% premium subscription ratio. In October of that year, Silicon Valley Insider ranked the company No. 10 on its Top 100 List of most valuable startups. By December, the company was valued at $1.575 billion in private markets. LinkedIn started its India operations in 2009 and a major part of the first year was dedicated to understanding professionals in India and educating members to leverage LinkedIn for career development.

2011 to present 

LinkedIn filed for an initial public offering in January 2011. The company traded its first shares on May 19, 2011, under the NYSE symbol "LNKD", at $45 per share. Shares of LinkedIn rose as much as 171% on their first day of trade on the New York Stock Exchange and closed at $94.25, more than 109% above IPO price. Shortly after the IPO, the site's underlying infrastructure was revised to allow accelerated revision-release cycles. In 2011 LinkedIn earned $154.6 million in advertising revenue alone, surpassing Twitter, which earned $139.5 million. LinkedIn's fourth-quarter 2011, earnings soared because of the company's increase in success in the social media world. By this point LinkedIn had about 2,100 full-time employees compared to the 500 that it had in 2010.

In April 2014 LinkedIn announced that it had leased 222 Second Street, a 26-story building under construction in San Francisco's SoMa district, to accommodate up to 2,500 of its employees, with the lease covering 10 years. The goal was to join all San Francisco-based staff (1,250 as of January 2016) in one building, bringing sales and marketing employees together with the research and development team. In March 2016 they started to move in. In February 2016 following an earnings report, LinkedIn's shares dropped 43.6% within a single day, down to $108.38 per share. LinkedIn lost $10 billion of its market capitalization that day.

In 2016 access to LinkedIn was blocked by Russian authorities for non-compliance with the 2015 national legislation that requires social media networks to store citizens' personal data on servers located in Russia.

In June 2016, Microsoft announced that it would acquire LinkedIn for $196 a share, a total value of $26.2 billion, and the second largest acquisition made by Microsoft to date. The acquisition would be an all-cash, debt-financed transaction. Microsoft would allow LinkedIn to "retain its distinct brand, culture and independence", with Weiner to remain as CEO, who would then report to Microsoft CEO Satya Nadella. Analysts believed Microsoft saw the opportunity to integrate LinkedIn with its Office product suite to help better integrate the professional network system with its products. The deal was completed on December 8, 2016.

In late 2016 LinkedIn announced a planned increase of 200 new positions in its Dublin office, which would bring the total employee count to 1,200. Since 2017 94% of B2B marketers use LinkedIn to distribute content.

Soon after LinkedIn's acquisition by Microsoft, LinkedIn's new desktop version was introduced. The new version was meant to make the user experience seamless across mobile and desktop. Some changes were made according to the feedback received from the previously launched mobile app. Features that were not heavily used were removed. For example, the contact tagging and filtering features are not supported anymore.

Following the launch of the new user interface (UI), some users complained about the missing features which were there in the older version, slowness, and bugs in it. The issues were faced by free and premium users and with both the desktop and mobile versions of the site.

In 2019 LinkedIn launched globally the feature Open for Business that enables freelancers to be discovered on the platform. LinkedIn Events was launched in the same year.

In June 2020 Jeff Weiner stepped down as CEO and become executive chairman after 11 years in the role. Ryan Roslansky stepped up as CEO from his previous position as the senior vice president of product. In late July 2020, LinkedIn announced it laid off 960 employees, about 6 percent of total workforce, from the talent acquisition and global sales teams. In an email to all employees, CEO Ryan Roslansky said the cuts were due to effects of the global COVID-19 pandemic.
In April 2021 CyberNews claimed that 500 million LinkedIn's accounts have leaked online. However, LinkedIn stated that "We have investigated an alleged set of LinkedIn data that has been posted for sale and have determined that it is actually an aggregation of data from a number of websites and companies".

In June 2021 PrivacySharks claimed that more than 700 million LinkedIn records was on sale on a hacker forum.  LinkedIn later stated that this is not a breach, but scraped data which is also a violation of their Terms of Service.

Microsoft ended LinkedIn operations in China in October 2021.

Acquisitions 
In July 2012 LinkedIn acquired 15 key Digg patents for $4 million including a "click a button to vote up a story" patent.

Perkins lawsuit 
In 2013 a class action lawsuit entitled Perkins vs. LinkedIn Corp was filed against the company, accusing it of automatically sending invitations to contacts in a member's email address book without permission. The court agreed with LinkedIn that permission had in fact been given for invitations to be sent, but not for the two further reminder emails. LinkedIn settled the lawsuit in 2015 for $13 million. Many members should have received a notice in their email with the subject line "Legal Notice of Settlement of Class Action". The Case No. is 13-CV-04303-LHK.

hiQ Labs v. LinkedIn 

In May 2017 LinkedIn sent a Cease-And-Desist letter to hiQ Labs, a Silicon Valley startup that collects data from public profiles and provides analysis of this data to its customers. The letter demanded that hiQ immediately cease "scraping" data from LinkedIn's servers, claiming violations of the CFAA (Computer Fraud and Abuse Act) and the DMCA (Digital Millennium Copyright Act). In response hiQ sued LinkedIn in the Northern District of California in San Francisco, asking the court to prohibit LinkedIn from blocking its access to public profiles while the court considered the merits of its request. The court served a preliminary injunction against LinkedIn, which was then forced to allow hiQ to continue to collect public data. LinkedIn appealed this ruling; in September 2019, the appeals court rejected LinkedIn's arguments and the preliminary injunction was upheld. The dispute is ongoing.

Membership 

As of 2015 LinkedIn had more than 400 million members in over 200 countries and territories. It is significantly ahead of its competitors Viadeo (50 million as of 2013) and XING (11 million as of 2016). In 2011, its membership grew by approximately two new members every second. In 2020 LinkedIn's membership grew to over 690 million LinkedIn members. As of September 2021 LinkedIn has 774+ million registered members from over 200 countries and territories.

Platform and features

User profile network

Basic functionality

The basic functionality of LinkedIn allows users to create profiles, which for employees typically consist of a curriculum vitae describing their work experience, education and training, skills, and a personal photo. Employers can list jobs and search for potential candidates. Users can find jobs, people and business opportunities recommended by someone in one's contact network. Users can save jobs that they would like to apply for. Users also have the ability to follow different companies.

The site also enables members to make "connections" to each other in an online social network which may represent real-world professional relationships. Members can invite anyone to become a connection. Users can obtain introductions to the connections of connections (termed second-degree connections) and connections of second-degree connections (termed third-degree connections).

A member's list of connections can be used in a number of ways. For example, users can search for second-degree connections who work at a company they are interested in, and then ask a specific first-degree connection in common for an introduction. The "gated-access approach" (where contact with any professional requires either an existing relationship, or the intervention of a contact of theirs) is intended to build trust among the service's users. LinkedIn participated in the EU's International Safe Harbor Privacy Principles.

Users can interact with each other in a variety of ways:
 Connections can interact by choosing to "like" posts and "congratulate" others on updates such as birthdays, anniversaries and new positions, as well as by direct messaging.
 Users can share video with text and filters with the introduction of LinkedIn Video.
 Users can write posts and articles within the LinkedIn platform to share with their network.

Since September 2012 LinkedIn has enabled users to "endorse" each other's skills. However, there is no way of flagging anything other than positive content. LinkedIn solicits endorsements using algorithms that generate skills members might have. Members cannot opt out of such solicitations, with the result that it sometimes appears that a member is soliciting an endorsement for a non-existent skill.

Applications 
LinkedIn 'applications' often refer to external third-party applications that interact with LinkedIn's developer API. However, in some cases, it could refer to sanctioned applications featured on a user's profile page.

External, third party applications 
In February 2015 LinkedIn released an updated terms of use for their developer API. The developer API allows both companies and individuals the ability to interact with LinkedIn's data through creation of managed third-party applications. Applications must go through a review process and request permission from the user before accessing a user's data.

Normal use of the API is outlined in LinkedIn's developer documents, including:
 Sign into external services using LinkedIn
 Add items or attributes to a user profile
 Share items or articles to user's timeline

Embedded in profile 
In October 2008, LinkedIn enabled an "applications platform" which allows external online services to be embedded within a member's profile page. Among the initial applications were an Amazon Reading List that allows LinkedIn members to display books they are reading, a connection to Tripit, and a Six Apart, WordPress and TypePad application that allows members to display their latest blog postings within their LinkedIn profile. In November 2010, LinkedIn allowed businesses to list products and services on company profile pages; it also permitted LinkedIn members to "recommend" products and services and write reviews. Shortly after, some of the external services were no longer supported, including Amazon's Reading List.

Mobile 
A mobile version of the site was launched in February 2008 and made available in six languages: Chinese, English, French, German, Japanese and Spanish. In January 2011, LinkedIn acquired CardMunch, a mobile app maker that scans business cards and converts into contacts. In June 2013, CardMunch was noted as an available LinkedIn app. In October 2013, LinkedIn announced a service for iPhone users called "Intro", which inserts a thumbnail of a person's LinkedIn profile in correspondence with that person when reading mail messages in the native iOS Mail program. This is accomplished by re-routing all emails from and to the iPhone through LinkedIn servers, which security firm Bishop Fox asserts has serious privacy implications, violates many organizations' security policies, and resembles a man-in-the-middle attack.

Groups 
LinkedIn also supports daily the formation of interest groups. In 2012 there were 1,248,019 such groups whose membership varies from 1 to 744,662. Groups support a limited form of discussion area, moderated by the group owners and managers. Groups may be private, accessible to members only or may be open to Internet users in general to read, though they must join in order to post messages. Since groups offer the functionality to reach a wide audience without so easily falling foul of anti-spam solutions, there is a constant stream of spam postings, and there now exists a range of firms who offer a spamming service for this very purpose. LinkedIn has devised a few mechanisms to reduce the volume of spam, but recently took the decision to remove the ability of group owners to inspect the email address of new members in order to determine if they were spammers. Groups also keep their members informed through emails with updates to the group, including most talked about discussions within your professional circles.

In December 2011 LinkedIn announced that they are rolling out polls to groups. In November 2013, LinkedIn announced the addition of Showcase Pages to the platform. In 2014, LinkedIn announced they were going to be removing Product and Services Pages paving the way for a greater focus on Showcase Pages.

Knowledge graph 
LinkedIn maintains an internal knowledge graph of entities (people, organizations, groups) that helps it connect everyone working in a field or at an organization or network.  This can be used to query the neighborhood around each entity to find updates that might be related to it.
This also lets them train machine learning models that can infer new properties about an entity, or new information that may apply to it, for both summary views and for analytics.

Discontinued features 
In January 2013 LinkedIn dropped support for LinkedIn Answers and cited a new 'focus on development of new and more engaging ways to share and discuss professional topics across LinkedIn' as the reason for the retirement of the feature. The feature had been launched in 2007 and allowed users to post questions to their network and allowed users to rank answers.

In 2014 LinkedIn retired InMaps, a feature which allowed you to visualize your professional network. The feature had been in use since January 2011.

According to the company's website, LinkedIn Referrals will no longer be available after May 2018.

In September 2021 LinkedIn discontinued LinkedIn stories, a feature that was rolled out worldwide in October 2020.

Usage

Personal branding

LinkedIn is particularly well-suited for personal branding which, according to Sandra Long, entails "actively managing one's image and unique value" to position oneself for career opportunities. LinkedIn has evolved from being a mere platform for job searchers into a social network which allows users a chance to create a personal brand. Career coach Pamela Green describes a personal brand as the "emotional experience you want people to have as a result of interacting with you," and a LinkedIn profile is an aspect of that. A contrasting report suggests that a personal brand is "a public-facing persona, exhibited on LinkedIn, Twitter and other networks, that showcases expertise and fosters new connections."

LinkedIn allows professionals to build exposure for their personal brand within the site itself as well as in the World Wide Web as a whole. With a tool that LinkedIn dubs a Profile Strength Meter, the site encourages users to offer enough information in their profile to optimize visibility by search engines. It can strengthen a user's LinkedIn presence if he or she belongs to professional groups in the site. The site enables users to add video to their profiles. Some users hire a professional photographer for their profile photo. Video presentations can be added to one's profile. LinkedIn's capabilities have been expanding so rapidly that a cottage industry of outside consultants has grown up to help users navigate the system. A particular emphasis is helping users with their LinkedIn profiles.

In October 2012, LinkedIn launched the LinkedIn Influencers program, which features global thought leaders who share their professional insights with LinkedIn's members. As of May 2016, there are 750+ Influencers. The program is invite-only and features leaders from a range of industries including Richard Branson, Narendra Modi, Arianna Huffington, Greg McKeown, Rahm Emanuel, Jamie Dimon, Martha Stewart, Deepak Chopra, Jack Welch, and Bill Gates.

Job seeking
LinkedIn is widely used by job seekers and employers. According to Jack Meyer the site has become the "premier digital platform" for professionals to network online. In Australia, which has approximately twelve million working professionals, ten million of them are on LinkedIn, according to Anastasia Santoreneos, suggesting that the probability was high that one's "future employer is probably on the site." According to one estimate based on worldwide figures, 122 million users got job interviews via LinkedIn and 35 million were hired by a LinkedIn online connection.

LinkedIn also allows users to research companies, non-profit organizations, and governments they may be interested in working for. Typing the name of a company or organization in the search box causes pop-up data about the company or organization to appear. Such data may include the ratio of female to male employees, the percentage of the most common titles/positions held within the company, the location of the company's headquarters and offices, and a list of present and former employees. In July 2011, LinkedIn launched a new feature allowing companies to include an "Apply with LinkedIn" button on job listing pages. The new plugin allowed potential employees to apply for positions using their LinkedIn profiles as resumes.

LinkedIn can help small businesses connect with customers.  In the site's parlance, two users have a "first-degree connection" when one accepts an invitation from another. People connected to each of them are "second-degree connections" and persons connected to the second-degree connections are "third-degree connections." This forms a user's internal LinkedIn network, making the user's profile more likely to appear in searches.

LinkedIn's Profinder is a marketplace where freelancers can (for a monthly subscription fee) bid for project proposals submitted by individuals and small businesses. In 2017, it had around 60,000 freelancers in more than 140 service areas, such as headshot photography, bookkeeping or tax filing.

The premise for connecting with someone has shifted significantly in recent years. Prior to the 2017 new interface being launched, LinkedIn encouraged connections between people who'd already worked together, studied together, done business together or the like. Since 2017 that step has been removed from the connection request process - and users are allowed to connect with up to 30,000 people. This change means LinkedIn is a more proactive networking site, be that for job applicants trying to secure a career move or for salespeople wanting to generate new client leads.

Top Companies 
LinkedIn Top Companies is a series of lists published by LinkedIn, identifying companies in the United States, Australia, Brazil, Canada, China, France, Germany, India, Japan, Mexico and the United Kingdom that are attracting the most intense interest from job candidates. The 2019 lists identified Google's parent company, Alphabet, as the most sought-after U.S. company, with Facebook ranked second and Amazon ranked third. The lists are based on more than one billion actions by LinkedIn members worldwide. The Top Companies lists were started in 2016 and are published annually. The 2021 top list identified Amazon as the top company with Alphabet ranked second and JPMorgan & Chase Co. ranked third.

Top Voices and other rankings 
Since 2015 LinkedIn has published annual rankings of Top Voices on the platform, recognizing "members that generated the most engagement and interaction with their posts." The 2020 lists included 14 industry categories, ranging from data science to sports, as well as 14 country lists, extending from Australia to Italy.

LinkedIn also publishes data-driven annual rankings of the Top Startups in more than a dozen countries, based on "employment growth, job interest from potential candidates, engagement, and attraction of top talent."

Advertising and for-pay research 
In 2008 LinkedIn launched LinkedIn DirectAds as a form of sponsored advertising. In October 2008, LinkedIn revealed plans to open its social network of 30 million professionals globally as a potential sample for business-to-business research. It is testing a potential social network revenue model – research that to some appears more promising than advertising. On July 23, 2013, LinkedIn announced their Sponsored Updates ad service. Individuals and companies can now pay a fee to have LinkedIn sponsor their content and spread it to their user base. This is a common way for social media sites such as LinkedIn to generate revenue.

Business Manager 
LinkedIn today announced the creation of Business Manager. The new Business Manager is a centralized platform designed to make it easier for large companies and agencies to manage people, ad accounts and business pages.

Publishing platform 
In 2015, LinkedIn added an analytics tool to its publishing platform. The tool allows authors to better track traffic that their posts receive. In relation to this functionality LinkedIn has gained more users over the years in the interest of clear monitoring of user's posts through post-performance analytics

Future plans

Economic graph 
Inspired by Facebook's "social graph", LinkedIn CEO Jeff Weiner set a goal in 2012 to create an "economic graph" within a decade. The goal was to create a comprehensive digital map of the world economy and the connections within it. The economic graph was to be built on the company's current platform with data nodes including companies, jobs, skills, volunteer opportunities, educational institutions, and content. They have been hoping to include all the job listings in the world, all the skills required to get those jobs, all the professionals who could fill them, and all the companies (nonprofit and for-profit) at which they work. The ultimate goal is to make the world economy and job market more efficient through increased transparency. In June 2014, the company announced its "Galene" search architecture to give users access to the economic graph's data with more thorough filtering of data, via user searches like "Engineers with Hadoop experience in Brazil."

LinkedIn has used economic graph data to research several topics on the job market, including popular destination cities of recent college graduates, areas with high concentrations of technology skills, and common career transitions. LinkedIn provided the City of New York with data from economic graph showing "in-demand" tech skills for the city's "Tech Talent Pipeline" project.

Role in networking 
LinkedIn has been described by online trade publication TechRepublic as having "become the de facto tool for professional networking". LinkedIn has also been praised for its usefulness in fostering business relationships. "LinkedIn is, far and away, the most advantageous social networking tool available to job seekers and business professionals today," according to Forbes. LinkedIn has inspired the creation of specialised professional networking opportunities, such as co-founder Eddie Lou's Chicago startup, Shiftgig (released in 2012 as a platform for hourly workers).

Criticism and controversies

Controversial design choices

Endorsement feature 
The feature that allows LinkedIn members to "endorse" each other's skills and experience has been criticized as meaningless, since the endorsements are not necessarily accurate or given by people who have familiarity with the member's skills. In October 2016, LinkedIn acknowledged that it "really does matter who endorsed you" and began highlighting endorsements from "coworkers and other mutual connections" to address the criticism.

Use of e-mail accounts of members for spam sending 
LinkedIn sends "invite emails" to Outlook contacts from its members' email accounts, without obtaining their consent. The "invitations" give the impression that the e-mail holder themself has sent the invitation. If there is no response, the answer will be repeated several times ("You have not yet answered XY's invitation.") LinkedIn was sued in the United States on charges of hijacking e-mail accounts and spamming. The company argued with the right to freedom of expression. In addition, the users concerned would be supported in building a network.

The sign-up process includes users entering their email password (there is an opt-out feature). LinkedIn will then offer to send out contact invitations to all members in that address book or that the user has had email conversations with. When the member's email address book is opened, it is opened with all email addresses selected, and the member is advised invitations will be sent to "selected" email addresses, or to all. LinkedIn was sued for sending out another two follow-up invitations to each contact from members to link to friends who had ignored the initial, authorized invitation.

In November 2014 LinkedIn lost a motion to dismiss the lawsuit, in a ruling that the invitations were advertisements not broadly protected by free speech rights that would otherwise permit use of people's names and images without authorization. The lawsuit was eventually settled in 2015 in favor of LinkedIn members.

Moving emails to LinkedIn servers 
At the end of 2013 it was announced that the LinkedIn app intercepted users' emails and quietly moved them to LinkedIn servers for full access. LinkedIn used man-in-the-middle attacks.

Security incidents

2012 hack 

In June 2012 cryptographic hashes of approximately 6.4 million LinkedIn user passwords were stolen by Yevgeniy Nikulin and other hackers who then published the stolen hashes online. This action is known as the 2012 LinkedIn hack. In response to the incident, LinkedIn asked its users to change their passwords. Security experts criticized LinkedIn for not salting their password file and for using a single iteration of SHA-1. On May 31, 2013, LinkedIn added two-factor authentication, an important security enhancement for preventing hackers from gaining access to accounts. In May 2016, 117 million LinkedIn usernames and passwords were offered for sale online for the equivalent of $2,200. These account details are believed to be sourced from the original 2012 LinkedIn hack, in which the number of user IDs stolen had been underestimated. To handle the large volume of emails sent to its users every day with notifications for messages, profile views, important happenings in their network, and other things, LinkedIn uses the Momentum email platform from Message Systems.

Potential 2018 breach, or extended impacts from earlier incidents 
In July 2018 Credit Wise reported "dark web" email and password exposures from LinkedIn. Shortly thereafter, users began receiving extortion emails, using that information as "evidence" that users' contacts had been hacked, and threatening to expose pornographic videos featuring the users. LinkedIn asserts that this is related to the 2012 breach; however, there is no evidence that this is the case.

2021 breaches 
A breach disclosed in April 2021 affected 500 million users. A breach disclosed in June 2021 was thought to have affected 92% of users, exposing contact information, employment information. LinkedIn asserted that the data was aggregated via web scraping from LinkedIn as well as several other sites, and noted that "only information that people listed publicly in their profiles" was included.

Malicious behavior on LinkedIn

Phishing 
In what is known as Operation Socialist, documents released by Edward Snowden in the 2013 global surveillance disclosures revealed that British Government Communications Headquarters (GCHQ) (an intelligence and security organisation) infiltrated the Belgian telecommunications network Belgacom by luring employees to a false LinkedIn page.

In 2014 Dell SecureWorks Counter Threat Unit (CTU) discovered that Threat Group-2889, an Iran-based group, created 25 fake LinkedIn accounts.  The accounts were either fully developed personas or supporting personas. They use spearphishing and malicious websites against their victims.

According to reporting by Le Figaro, France's General Directorate for Internal Security and Directorate-General for External Security believe that Chinese spies have used LinkedIn to target thousands of business and government officials as potential sources of information.

In 2017 Germany's Federal Office for the Protection of the Constitution (BfV) published information alleging that Chinese intelligence services had created fake social media profiles on sites such as LinkedIn, using them to gather information on German politicians and government officials.

In 2022, the company ranked first in a list of brands most likely to be imitated in phishing attempts.

False and misleading information 
LinkedIn has come under scrutiny for its handling of misinformation and disinformation. The platform has struggled to deal with fake profiles and falsehoods about COVID-19 and the 2020 US presidential election.

Policies

Privacy policy 
The German Stiftung Warentest has criticized that the balance of rights between users and LinkedIn is disproportionate, restricting users' rights excessively while granting the company far-reaching rights. It has also been claimed that LinkedIn does not respond to consumer protection center requests.

Research on labor market effects

In 2010 Social Science Computer Review published research by economists Ralf Caers and Vanessa Castelyns who sent an online questionnaire to 398 and 353 LinkedIn and Facebook users respectively in Belgium and found that both sites had become tools for recruiting job applicants for professional occupations as well as additional information about applicants, and that it was being used by recruiters to decide which applicants would receive interviews. In May 2017, Research Policy published an analysis of PhD holders use of LinkedIn and found that PhD holders who move into industry were more likely to have LinkedIn accounts and to have larger networks of LinkedIn connections, were more likely to use LinkedIn if they had co-authors abroad, and to have wider networks if they moved abroad after obtaining their PhD.

Also in 2017 sociologist Ofer Sharone conducted interviews with unemployed workers to research the effects of LinkedIn and Facebook as labor market intermediaries and found that social networking services (SNS) have had a filtration effect that has little to do with evaluations of merit, and that the SNS filtration effect has exerted new pressures on workers to manage their careers to conform to the logic of the SNS filtration effect. In October 2018 Foster School of Business professors Melissa Rhee, Elina Hwang, and Yong Tan performed an empirical analysis of whether the common professional networking tactic by job seekers of creating LinkedIn connections with professionals who work at a target company or in a target field is actually instrumental in obtaining referrals and found instead that job seekers were less likely to be referred by employees who were employed by the target company or in the target field due to job similarity and self-protection from competition. Rhee, Hwang, and Tan further found that referring employees in higher hierarchical positions than the job candidates were more likely to provide referrals and that gender homophily did not reduce the competition self-protection effect.

In July 2019 sociologists Steve McDonald, Amanda K. Damarin, Jenelle Lawhorne, and Annika Wilcox performed qualitative interviews with 61 Human resources recruiters in two metropolitan areas in the Southern United States and found that recruiters filling low- and general-skilled positions typically posted advertisements on online job boards while recruiters filling high-skilled or supervisor positions targeted passive candidates on LinkedIn (i.e. employed workers not actively seeking work but possibly willing to change positions), and concluded that this is resulting in a bifurcated winner-takes-all job market with recruiters focusing their efforts on poaching already employed high-skilled workers while active job seekers are relegated to hyper-competitive online job boards.

In a September 2019 working paper, economists Laurel Wheeler, Robert Garlick, and RTI International scholars Eric Johnson, Patrick Shaw, and Marissa Gargano ran a randomized evaluation of training job seekers in South Africa to use LinkedIn as part of job readiness programs. The evaluation found that the training increased the job seekers employment by approximately 10 percent by reducing information frictions between job seekers and prospective employers, that the training had this effect for approximately 12 months, and that while the training may also have facilitated referrals, it did not reduce job search costs and the jobs for the treatment and control groups in the evaluation had equal probabilities of retention, promotion, and obtaining a permanent contract. In 2020, Applied Economics published research by economists Steffen Brenner, Sezen Aksin Sivrikaya, and Joachim Schwalbach using LinkedIn demonstrating that high status individuals self-select into professional networking services rather than workers unsatisfied with their career status adversely selecting into the services to receive networking benefits.

International restrictions 
In 2009, Syrian users reported that LinkedIn server stopped accepting connections originating from IP addresses assigned to Syria. The company's customer support stated that services provided by them are subject to US export and re-export control laws and regulations and "As such, and as a matter of corporate policy, we do not allow member accounts or access to our site from Cuba, Iran, North Korea, Sudan, or Syria."

In February 2011 it was reported that LinkedIn was being blocked in China after calls for a "Jasmine Revolution". It was speculated to have been blocked because it is an easy way for dissidents to access Twitter, which had been blocked previously. After a day of being blocked, LinkedIn access was restored in China.

In February 2014, LinkedIn launched its Simplified Chinese language version named "", officially extending their service in China. LinkedIn CEO Jeff Weiner acknowledged in a blog post that they would have to censor some of the content that users post on its website in order to comply with Chinese rules, but he also said the benefits of providing its online service to people in China outweighed those concerns. Since Autumn 2017 job postings from western countries for China aren't possible anymore.

In 2016, a Moscow court ruled that LinkedIn must be blocked in Russia for violating a data retention law which requires the user data of Russian citizens to be stored on servers within the country. The relevant law had been in force there since 2014. This ban was upheld on November 10, 2016, and all Russian ISPs began blocking LinkedIn thereafter. LinkedIn's mobile app was also banned from Google Play Store and iOS App Store in Russia in January 2017. In July 2021 it was also blocked in Kazakhstan.

In October 2021 after reports of several academicians and reporters who received notifications regarding their profiles will be blocked in China, Microsoft confirmed that LinkedIn will be shutting down in China and replaced with InJobs, a China exclusive app, citing difficulties in operating environments and increasing compliance requirements.

Open source contributions 
Since 2010 LinkedIn has contributed multiple internal technologies, tools, and software products to the open source domain. Notable among these projects is Apache Kafka, which was built and open sourced at LinkedIn in 2011. The team behind the creation of Kafka formed a LinkedIn spin-out company in 2014 named Confluent, which went public with an IPO in 2021. A list of LinkedIn's active open source projects can be found on their engineering website.

Research using data from the platform 
Massive amounts of data from LinkedIn allow scientists and machine learning researchers to extract insights and build product features. For example, this data can help to shape patterns of deception in resumes. Findings suggested that people commonly lie about their hobbies rather than their work experience on online resumes.

See also 

 Business network
 Employment website
 List of social networking services
 Reputation systems
 Social network
 Social software
 Timeline of social media

References

External links 

 

 
2002 establishments in California
2011 initial public offerings
Companies based in Mountain View, California
Business services companies established in 2002
Internet properties established in 2002
Professional networks
Recruitment
American social networking websites
Employment social networks
Employment websites in the United States
Companies formerly listed on the New York Stock Exchange
Microsoft acquisitions
Microsoft subsidiaries
Microsoft divisions
2016 mergers and acquisitions